Allport is a surname. Notable people with the surname include:

Alan Allport (born 1970), British historian
Alfred Allport (1867–1949), English rugby union player
Carolyn Allport (c. 1950 – 2017), Australian historian and activist
Chris M. Allport (born 1977), American composer, conductor, filmmaker, actor
Christopher Allport (1947–2008), American actor
Floyd Henry Allport, (1890–1978) American psychologist
Gordon Allport, (1897–1967) American psychologist
Harry Allport (1873–?), English footballer
James Joseph Allport (1811–1892), English railway manager
(James) Russell Allport (d. 1914), Australian electrical engineer in Hobart, Tasmania.
Lily Allport (1860–1949), Australian artist 
Mary Morton Allport (1806–1895), English-Australian artist
Morton Allport (1830–1878), Australian naturalist and solicitor
Samuel Allport (1816–1897), English petrologist
Walter Webb Allport (1824–1893), American dentist